Loyset is a given name. Notable people with the name include:

 Loyset Compère ( 1445 – 1518), Franco-Flemish composer
 Loyset Liédet (1420 –  1480), Dutch miniaturist and illuminator

See also
 Loysel (surname)